is a town located in Ibaraki Prefecture, Japan. , the city had an estimated population of 8,298 in 2986 households and a population density of 183 persons per km². The percentage of the population aged over 65 was 39.5%.

Geography
Located in extreme southern Ibaraki Prefecture bordering Chiba Prefecture, Kawachi is long and narrow east-west, and bordered by the Tone River and Shin-Tone River.

Surrounding municipalities
Ibaraki Prefecture
 Ryūgasaki
 Inashiki
 Tone
Chiba Prefecture
 Narita
 Sakae
 Kōzaki

Climate
Kawachi has a Humid continental climate (Köppen Cfa) characterized by warm summers and cool winters with light snowfall.  The average annual temperature in Kawachi is 14.4 °C. The average annual rainfall is 1376 mm with September as the wettest month. The temperatures are highest on average in August, at around 26.1 °C, and lowest in January, at around 3.6 °C.

Demographics
Per Japanese census data, the population of Kawachi has declined in recent decades and is now less that it was a century ago.

History
The villages of Nagasao, Genseida, and Mamaita were created within Kawachi District, Ibaraki Prefecture the establishment of the modern municipalities system on April 1, 1889. At the same time, the village of Kanaetsu from Katori District, Chiba and a portion of Toyosumi Village in Shimohabu District, Chiba were transferred to Ibaraki Prefecture. The border between ancient Hitachi Province and Shimōsa Province was the Tone River; however, due to shifting of the riverbed by the Meiji period, it was located on the north bank of the river. The three villages originally from Hitachi Province were merged to form the village of Kawachi on April 1, 1955. On February 15, 1958, the neighboring village of Kanaetsu was annexed to Kawachi.

Government
Kawachi has a mayor-council form of government with a directly elected mayor and a unicameral town council of 12 members. Kawachi, together with neighboring Inashiki, contributes one member to the Ibaraki Prefectural Assembly. In terms of national politics, the town is part of Ibaraki 3rd district of the lower house of the Diet of Japan.

Economy

Education
Kawachi Gakuen is the only compulsory education combined elementary and junior high school in Kawachi. The academy was established by integrating two junior high schools in 2017 and three elementary schools in 2018. The town does not have a senior high school.

Transportation

Railway
Kawachi does not have any passenger train service.

Highway

Local attractions
 Ōtone Airport

References

External links

Official Website 

Towns in Ibaraki Prefecture
Kawachi, Ibaraki